Precis coelestina, the ocellated commodore, is a butterfly in the family Nymphalidae. It is found in Guinea, Sierra Leone, Nigeria, Cameroon, Angola, the Central African Republic, the Democratic Republic of the Congo (Kinshasa, Kasai, Sankuru, Lualaba), Uganda, western Kenya, southern Sudan, western Ethiopia and Somalia. The habitat consists of semi montane areas.

References

Butterflies described in 1879
Junoniini
Butterflies of Africa
Taxa named by Hermann Dewitz